Baroness Armgard of Sierstorpff-Cramm, known as Armgard von Cramm (18 December 188327 April 1971) was the mother of Prince Bernhard of Lippe-Biesterfeld, Prince consort of Queen Juliana of the Netherlands.

Early life
Armgard was born at Bad Driburg, Kingdom of Prussia (now in North Rhine-Westphalia, Germany), fourth child and daughter of Baron Aschwin of Sierstorpff-Cramm (1846–1909), and his wife, Baroness Hedwig of Sierstorpff-Driburg (1848–1900). By birth she belonged to the ancient House of Cramm.

Marriages
Armgard married on 24 October 1905 at Hanover to Count Bodo von Oeynhausen (1881–1909), an officer in the 8th Hussars in Paderborn, son of Count Erich von Oeynhausen (1849-1898) and his wife, Therese von Lenthe (1846-1917). They divorced in 1908 and had no children.

Armgard married secondly, after the death of her ex-husband, on 4 March 1909 at Oelber, Brunswick to Prince Bernhard of Lippe-Biesterfeld (1872–1934), a younger son of Ernest II, Count of Lippe-Biesterfeld, regent (1897–1904) of the Principality of Lippe, and his wife, Countess Karoline of Wartensleben. The marriage was at first considered morganatic, as Armgard's family didn't belong to one of the reigning or former reigning families. Thus, she was created "Countess of Biesterfeld" on 8 February 1909.

They had two sons:
Prince Bernhard of Lippe-Biesterfeld (29 June 1911 – 1 December 2004), married in 1937 to Juliana of the Netherlands, had issue.
Prince Aschwin of Lippe-Biesterfeld (13 June 1914 – 14 May 1988), married in 1951 to Simone Arnoux, no issue.

On 24 February 1916 she was made "Princess of Lippe-Biesterfeld" with the style Serene Highness by her brother-in-law, Leopold IV, Prince of Lippe, and this title was extended to her two sons in order to produce a new branch of the Lippe family.

World War II
After the death of her husband in 1934, Armgard moved into Reckenwalde castle with her sons and managed an estate in Wojnowo, Lubusz Voivodeship, Province of Brandenburg (now Wojnowo, Poland), together with her new partner Alexis Pantchoulidzew. Alexis accompanied Armgard to the wedding of Bernhard to Princess Juliana.

During World War II Armgard and Alexis were observed by the local Gestapo. Her apolitical past and the service that the monarchist and anti-Stalinist Colonel Pantchoulidzew later rendered in the war to the German Reich Railway, would have shielded her from Nazi authorities. The SS demanded in September 1944 in Recke, one of Armgard's properties, Schloss Woynowo Walde for military purposes. Armgard and Alexis gave an account of the withdrawal in 1945 of the Wehrmacht behind the Oder-line on their estate at Neumark.

Various writers, W.Klinkenberg a.o. have accused Armgard of sexual promiscuity, intrigue, conspiracy, and – as with her son Aschwin – of Nazi sympathies. In March 2004, her son Bernhard tried to rectify this image with an open letter to The Times.

Life in the Netherlands
She lived from early 1952 with her partner Alexis Pantchoulidzew in House Warmelo at Diepenheim. Alexis went on to be the Netherlands' sole representative at the 1956 Summer Olympics, competing in dressage. Alexis Pantchoulidzew died in 1968.

Armgard died on 27 April 1971  in House Warmelo in Diepenheim at the age of 87.

Ancestry

References

Further reading

. Zur Lippe-Biesterfeld- Prof. mr. E.J.H.Schrage

thePeerage.com – Armgard von Cramm
Genealogisches Handbuch des Adels, Fürstliche Häuser, Reference

1883 births
1971 deaths
People from Bad Driburg
People from the Province of Westphalia
Armgard
Morganatic spouses of German royalty
Princesses by marriage
German baronesses
German countesses
German princesses